Heradsbygd is a village in Elverum municipality, Innlandet county, Norway. The Norwegian National Road 2 and Solørbanen railway line both pass through the village. Heradsbygd Church is located in the village.

References

Elverum
Villages in Innlandet